BBC Radio 1 Relax is a British online-only radio stream, owned and operated by the BBC and run as a spin-off from Radio 1. The station plays a selection of relaxation and well-being focussed shows, and broadcasts exclusively on BBC Sounds.

History and launch

In September 2020, the BBC announced that a new "stream" named BBC Radio 1 Dance would launch on BBC Sounds on 9 October 2020, with a 4-hour simulcast on Radio 1 and Radio 1 Dance.

As part of the BBC's Annual Plan 2021/22 released in March 2021, the corporation announced plans to launch "a new stream of content to help young audiences, in particular, to manage stress and wellbeing through music and speech content".

Following this, on 22 April 2021, the BBC announced that Radio 1 Relax would launch that evening, in line with Earth Day 2021, from 17:00, with Annie Mac and Nick Grimshaw hosting the first hour together, followed by Radio 1's Power Down Playlist at 18:00 and Radio 1's Chillest Show with Sian Eleri at 20:00.

Programming
Programming on the "stream" is repeated wellbeing and relaxation shows from BBC Radio 1 and BBC Sounds.

Radio 1 Relax will occasionally simulcast with Radio 1 on a Bank Holiday where Stuart Sandeman, Jess Iszatt and Sian Eleri will present the daytime shows (7am-6pm).

Monday to Saturday
 1am–2am: Radio 1's Deep Sleepscapes
 2am–3am: Radio 1's Relaxing ASMR
 3am–4am: 1Xtra's R&B Chill Mix with Nadia Jae (from BBC Radio 1Xtra)
 4am–6am: Focus Beats (from BBC Radio 6 Music)
 6am–7am: Radio 1 Relax in Love with Emma-Louise Amanshia
 7am–8am: Get Set with Adrienne Herbert
 8am–8:30am: Radio 1's Chill Mix
 8:30am–9am: Radio 1's Motivate Me Mix
 9am–10am: Radio 1 Relax with Jess Iszatt
 10am–11am: Radio 1 Relax in Love with Emma-Louise Amanshia
 11am–12pm: Radio 1's Chillout Anthems
 12pm–1pm: Radio 1 Relax with Jess Iszatt
 1pm–2pm: Radio 1's Chillout Anthems
 2pm–2:30pm: Radio 1's Motivate Me Mix
 2:30pm–3pm: Radio 1's Chill Mix
 3pm–5pm: Radio 1's Chillest Show with Sian Eleri
 5pm–7pm: Radio 1 Playlist: Revision Mode
 7pm–8pm: Radio 1's Decompression Session with Stuart Sandeman
 8pm–9pm: Radio 1's Wind Down Presents...
 9pm–10pm: Tearjerker with Sigrid (from BBC Radio 3)
 10pm–11pm: Radio 1's Power Down Playlist with Sian Eleri (simulcast with Radio 1, Monday to Wednesday)
 11pm–1am: Lose Yourself With... (from BBC Radio 6 Music)

Sunday
As Monday to Saturday, excluding below:
 7pm–9pm: Radio 1's Chillest Show with Sian Eleri (simulcast with Radio 1)
 9pm–10pm: Radio 1's Decompression Session with Stuart Sandeman

See also
BBC Radio 1 Dance

References 

Relax
Digital-only radio stations
1 Relax
Radio stations established in 2021
2021 establishments in the United Kingdom